Donald Clough Cameron (December 21, 1905 – November 17, 1954) was an American writer of detective novels and comic books. He is credited with creating several supporting characters and villains in DC Comics' line of Batman comic books.

Career
Donald Clough Cameron graduated from St. John's Military Academy in Delafield, Wisconsin and became a crime reporter for the Detroit Free Press in 1924 and later worked for the Windsor Star in Windsor, Ontario. In the 1930s, he settled in New York City and became a writer, publishing short stories, sometimes signed with the pseudonym C.A.M. Donne, for pulps and comic books.

Between 1939 and 1946, Cameron wrote six detective novels, three of which featured the young criminologist and detective Abelard Voss, who liked to take philosophical reflections during his investigations. The sixth and final novel by Don Cameron, White for a Shroud, features the character of Andrew Brant, the only journalist in a local newspaper, who investigates a series of murders committed in an American town isolated from the outside world by a snowstorm.

Cameron made several notable contributions to the Batman mythos. The story "Here Comes Alfred!" in Batman #16 (April–May 1943) by Cameron and Bob Kane introduced Alfred as Bruce Wayne's butler. Cameron co-created Tweedledum and Tweedledee in Detective Comics #74 (April 1943) and the Cavalier in Detective Comics #81 (Nov. 1943). His story "Brothers in Crime!" in Batman #12 (Aug.–Sept. 1942) featured "Batman's Hall of Trophies" a precursor to the Batcave, which debuted in Detective Comics #83 (Jan. 1944). Cameron and Win Mortimer created Batman's Batboat in Detective Comics #110 (April 1946). In addition, Cameron was one of the writers of the Batman comic strip for the McClure Newspaper Syndicate.
 
His work on Superman includes creating the Toyman in Action Comics #64 (Sept. 1943) and writing the earliest Superboy stories in More Fun Comics.

Cameron created Liberty Belle in Boy Commandos #1 (Winter 1942) and Pow Wow Smith in Detective Comics #151 (Sept. 1949). He was one of the writers of DC's Hopalong Cassidy licensed series based on the film and TV Western hero. Other comic book work by Cameron includes Aquaman, Congo Bill, and the Western character Nighthawk.
 
Donald Clough Cameron died of cancer in New York City in November 1954. His final comics story "The Giant Eagle Robberies" was published posthumously in Hopalong Cassidy #99 (March 1955).

Other similarly-named creators
Donald Clough Cameron should not be confused with the similarly-named Don Cameron, an artist who was also active during the Golden Age of Comic Books, nor with an unrelated Don Cameron, a comics artist who worked on the Cyberella series in the 1990s.

Bibliography

Comic books

 Action Comics #58, 61–68, 70–71, 77–83, 85–86, 88–90, 99–100, 102, 107, 109, 119, 148, 151, 192 (1943–1954)
 Adventure Comics #91, 103–121, 123–128, 132, 138, 141, 147–149, 151, 154, 156, 158, 160–166, 168, 171–174 (1944–1952)
 Batman #12–17, 19–21, 23–30, 32, 36, 38, 46 (1942–1948)
 Boy Commandos #1–2, 6–8, 12–13, 16, 27–28, 30, 33 (1942–1949)
 Detective Comics #70, 73–75, 79, 81–83, 86, 89, 96, 98–101, 105–111, 114–117, 131, 151–152, 154–156 (1942–1950)
 Hopalong Cassidy #86–90, 92–99 (1954–1955)
 More Fun Comics #101–107 (1945–1946)
 Star-Spangled Comics #20–49, 51–68 (1943–1947)
 Superboy #6, 11, 19 (1950–1952)
 Superman #23–24, 26–44, 47, 49–50, 53, 60 (1943–1949)
 Western Comics #2, 6, 15, 18, 21–28, 30, 32–42, 44–47 (1948–1954)
 World's Finest Comics #12–13, 15, 17–21, 23, 25, 28–31, 33–34, 45, 47–48, 61, 63 (1943–1953)

Novels

Abelard Voss series
 Murder's Coming (1939) 
 Grave Without Grass (1940) 
 And So He Had to Die (1941)

Other novels
 Death at Her Elbow (1940) 
 Dig Another Grave (1946) 
 White for a Shroud (1947)

Pulps

As Donald Clough Cameron
 Mood for Murder (1939) 
 In the Dark (1940) 
 Benjy Takes a Holiday (1944) 
 Attar of Homicide (1944)

As C.A.M. Donne
 Isle of Ghouls (1935) 
 Marriage for Murder (1937) 
 Vengeance of the Severed Hands (1937) 
 Judgment of the Ghost God (1937) 
 A Bride for the General (1939) 
 White Man's Magic (1941) 
 Rendezvous (1941) 
 No More Raids (1941)

References

External links
 Donald Clough Cameron at WorldCat
 
 Donald Clough Cameron at Mike's Amazing World of Comics

1905 births
1954 deaths
American comics writers
American crime fiction writers
American crime reporters
DC Comics people
Deaths from cancer in New York (state)
Golden Age comics creators
20th-century pseudonymous writers
Writers from Detroit
Novelists from Michigan